Beaver Creek Bridge may refer to thed following bridges in the United States:

 Beaver Creek Bridge (Ogden, Iowa), listed on the NRHP in Iowa
 Beaver Creek Bridge (Perry, Iowa), listed on the NRHP in Iowa
 Beaver Creek Bridge (Schleswig, Iowa), listed on the NRHP in Iowa
 Beaver Creek Native Stone Bridge, listed on the NRHP in Kansas
 Beaver Creek Bridge (Finley, North Dakota), listed on the NRHP in North Dakota
 Beaver Creek Bridge (Hot Springs, South Dakota), listed on the NRHP in South Dakota
 Beaver Creek Bridge (Electra, Texas), listed on the NRHP in Texas

See also
Beaver Bridge (disambiguation)
Little Beaver Creek Bridge, Lincoln Highway in Greene County, Iowa, U.S.